Jejomar Erwin "Junjun" Sombillo Binay Jr. (born July 12, 1977) is a Filipino politician who served as the mayor of Makati from 2010 to 2015. He was initially dismissed from office by the Ombudsman of the Philippines but this decision was overturned by the Court of Appeals in a ruling dated May 3, 2018. He is perpetually banned from holding public office after the Court of Appeals affirmed on May 28, 2019, charges of grave misconduct, dishonesty and conduct prejudicial to the best interest of the service over the construction of a Makati school building. He is the only son of former Vice President Jejomar Binay.

Early life
Binay was born on July 12, 1977, as the third of five children and the only son of Jejomar Binay and Elenita Sombillo. He is the younger brother of Nancy Binay, a current Senator, and Abby Binay, the current mayor of Makati. From 1996 to 2001, Binay attended the University of the Philippines Diliman, where he graduated with a B.A. degree in Philippine studies major in Malikhaing Pagsulat (creative writing), and public administration, cum laude. He also holds a master's degree in public administration from the UP National College for Public Administration and Governance.

Political career
At a young age, Binay was groomed by his father in local politics as a Sangguniang Kabataan (Youth Council) president from 1992 to 2001 and later as city councilor for three consecutive terms.

During his days as councilor, he was concurrently chairman of the Committee of Rules, Legal Matters and Ethics and the Committee on Education, Arts and Sciences. He was also a member of three other committees.

Being barred by the constitution to run for a fourth consecutive term, he ran instead for mayor for the 2010 Makati local elections. He had singer and former councilor Rico J. Puno as his running mate. He won the mayoral race defeating outgoing Vice Mayor Ernesto Mercado in a landslide victory, while Puno lost to Mercado's running mate, Makati's ABC President Romulo Peña Jr. from Barangay Valenzuela. He took oath on June 28, 2010, administered by Senator Francis Escudero at the Makati City Hall.

In the May 13, 2013, Makati local elections, Binay won over token opponent Renato Bondal via a massive landslide by garnering 208,748 of the total popular vote to secure a second term.

On June 29, 2015, Binay received his second suspension order from the Office of the Ombudsman in connection to the corruption allegations in the construction of the  Makati Science High School building. One day later, Binay stepped down as Mayor of Makati.

Binay, together with 22 others, was charged by graft and falsification of documents cases by the Ombudsman filed before Sandiganbayan on February 19, 2016, in connection with the construction of Makati City Hall Building II.

In 2019, Binay ran against his sister, incumbent Mayor Abby Binay, under the Una Ang Makati local party. He chose Makati's 1st district representative Monsour del Rosario of PDP–Laban as his running mate for vice mayor. He was then unsuccessful in regaining the post.

Binay is perpetually barred from holding office after the Court of Appeals on May 28, 2019, found him guilty of serious dishonesty, grave misconduct, and conduct prejudicial to the best interest of the service over irregularities in the construction of a Makati Science High School building. Binay's lawyers said they will appeal the decision.

Personal life
He was married to Kennely Ann Lacia (1980–2009), who was also known as former ABS-CBN talent Audrey Vizcara, until her death on August 11, 2009. They had four children: Jejomarie Alexi, Maria Isabel, Jejomar III, and Maria Kennely. His wife died due to complications while giving birth to their fourth child, who survived despite being born prematurely and was named Maria Kennely in memory of her mother.

References

1977 births
Jejomar Jr.
Living people
Mayors of Makati
PDP–Laban politicians
United Nationalist Alliance politicians
Metro Manila city and municipal councilors
People from Makati
University of the Philippines Diliman alumni
Filipino Roman Catholics